École secondaire publique Odyssée is a French-language secondary school located in North Bay, Ontario.

See also
List of high schools in Ontario

External links
 School web site

French-language high schools in Ontario
High schools in North Bay, Ontario
Educational institutions in Canada with year of establishment missing